The Grateful Dead had worked on songs in the early 1990s for an album that was intended to be the follow-up to Built to Last (1989), but it was never completed. This has sometimes been referred to as the unfinished last Grateful Dead album and The Missing Album. The band began work on a new album in February 1992, which was incomplete. After Jerry Garcia's death, the band had considered finishing the album, but it never came into fruition.

On October 8, 2019, it was announced that a new album entitled Ready or Not would be released on November 22, 2019. It contains 9 songs, recorded during live performances between 1992 and 1995. All songs are from the list given below.

Overview
In the early 1990s, the Grateful Dead had been working on new songs. When Jerry Garcia died in 1995, the band decided to break up and this album was never finished. Work on the unfinished album began in February 1992 in West Marin County in California, at a studio the band called "the Site", which was located on a hill with scenic views and occasional views of wildlife. At the time, Jerry Garcia was not particularly interested or focused upon the project, which discouraged its impetus. The studio session work did not have any lead vocals from songs that Garcia performed lead vocals on, and Garcia's guitar work on the tracks was described as "rudimentary." The tracks for the new album were incomplete.

In 1995, Phil Lesh was performing studio work on the unfinished album. At this time, Lesh stated that the album "... doesn't have much Jerry on it", referring to Garcia. In 1997, Bob Weir stated that the album could potentially be completed, but that it would take additional collaboration from the remaining band members. Weir and others stated at this time that they expected for a collaboration to finish the album to occur sometime in 1998. In August 1999, Lesh stated that he felt the content from the studio sessions did not merit use on an album, and that efforts to improve the content would not equate to what Garcia would have performed. In 1999, Dennis McNally, spokesperson for the Grateful Dead, stated that using another guitarist to fill-in for Garcia "would have been unconscionable", and that "without Garcia, there is no last album." So the album never came into fruition.

The box set So Many Roads (1965–1995) has six songs from live concert performance and rehearsal tracks from the unfinished Grateful Dead album.

This album would have had the most variety of lead singers for songs of any of the Grateful Dead's studio albums, other than American Beauty. There were four singers: Jerry Garcia, Bob Weir, Phil Lesh and Vince Welnick.

Fan renditions
Fans and book authors have created their own albums that could represent what they had been working on. An example of this is the mock-album Days Between (The Final Album That Never Was), put together by Tony Sclafani, author of the 2013 book The Grateful Dead FAQ: All That's Left to Know About the Greatest Jam Band in History. This would-be album is sketched out in Chapter 35 of his book; he also put together a video on YouTube, made up of studio and live recordings, so fans could hear what the album might have sounded like.

Another fine example of this is So Many Roads (1995, Full Album), a video on YouTube which collects studio quality recordings of the songs that were slated to be on the album. It also only has 10 tracks instead of twelve; the exclusions are "Samba in the Rain", and "If the Shoe Fits"

Track listing
The following are the songs that were planned for this album:

 "Liberty" (Jerry Garcia/Robert Hunter)
 "Samba in the Rain" (Vince Welnick/Robert Hunter)
 "So Many Roads" (Jerry Garcia/Robert Hunter)
 "Days Between" (Jerry Garcia/Robert Hunter)
 "Corrina" (Bob Weir/Mickey Hart/Robert Hunter)

 "If the Shoe Fits" (Phil Lesh/Andrew Charles)
 "Easy Answers" (Bob Weir/Bob Bralove/Rob Wasserman/Vince Welnick/Robert Hunter)
 "Eternity" (Bob Weir/Rob Wasserman/Willie Dixon)
 "Childhood's End" (Phil Lesh)
 "Way to Go Home" (Vince Welnick/Bob Bralove/Robert Hunter)
 "Wave to the Wind" (Phil Lesh/Robert Hunter)
 "Lazy River Road" (Jerry Garcia/Robert Hunter)

See also

 Unfinished creative work

References

External links
 Grateful Dead – official website

Grateful Dead
Unfinished albums